Arkiko (Afar and Saho: Hirg-Higo, alternately Archigo, Arqiqo, Ercoco, Hirgigo, Hargigo or Harkiko) is a town in the Northern Red Sea region of Eritrea. Situated on the Red Sea, it lies on the mainland across from the city of Massawa.

Overview
Arkiki or known by the locals Saho tribe; the clans of Dasamo, as Hirg-Higo. The clan of Dasamo are the inhabitant of this area, it is also known by the name Dahano, from either the Saho or Afar word for "elephant". The meaning of Higo is legend of legends in Saho language. Richard Pankhurst explains this etymology to the importance of the ivory trade to Hirg-Higo or known as Arkiko.

In 1826–48 (during the Ottoman period, but not the phase under de facto Egyptian rule), parts of Eritrea were ruled by the Naib (or deputy) of Hirg-Higo, according to some sources part of the time cumulating with the office of wali (regular military governor) of Massawa, the present capital.

This town was the site of a terrible massacre by the Dergue military junta of Ethiopia in 1975, during the Eritrean War of Independence. Also located in this town is Eritrea's largest power generation facility. This facility was partially destroyed during the Eritrean-Ethiopian War, but has now been fully repaired.

Climate and habitat
The region is reputedly one of the hottest inhabited places on earth, with temperatures soaring well above 40°C (104°F) for much of the year, combined with an average annual rainfall of less than two centimetres (an inch).

Formerly covering significant portions of the Eritrean coast, original mangrove forest was destroyed by overgrazing by camels or cutting for firewood or the building of homes and boats.

Economy
Today, Arkiko is the site of the artificial planting on mangrove trees with the help of low-cost slow-release fertilizer packs of nitrogen, phosphorus and iron, allowing the plant growth in areas previously uninhabited by trees. It is supported by the Eritrean Ministry of Fisheries, in the hope to restore mangrove coastline boosting the numbers of livestock, fish and seafood.

Notes

Geography of Eritrea
Populated places in Eritrea